This is a list of live action role-playing game groups. This is for active or once active groups that run or organize games.  It is not a list of game systems.



A

 Alliance LARP - Fantasy boffer LARP in the United States and Canada  
 Amtgard - Fantasy boffer combat group in the United States, Croatia and Canada
 Aurum LARP - Steampunk Fantasy boffer LARP located in New Jersey, USA

B

 Belegarth Medieval Combat Society - Fantasy boffer combat group in the United States and Canada
 Bicolline - Fantasy campaign with physical combat in Quebec

C

 ConQuest of Mythodea - Regular fantasy fest event in Germany
 Curious Pastimes - Fantasy/Combat Fest based system (UK)

D

 Dagorhir - Fantasy boffer combat group in the United States
 Darkon - Fantasy boffer combat group in the United States
 Drachenfest - Regular fantasy fest event in Germany
 Dragonbane - Large international fantasy game that ran in 2006 in Älvdalen, Sweden
 Dragoncrest - Fantasy boffer group in the United States
 Dystopia Rising - Post-apocalyptic zombie survival group in the United States

F

 Fools and Heroes - High fantasy group in the UK with physical combat

H

 Heroquest UK high fantasy LARP that uses a high hit system
 Herofest - UK fantasy LARP

K

Knight Realms - Fantasy Boffer LARP operating in Sparta, New Jersey, United States.

L

Labyrinthe - High fantasy, immersive Live Role-play (LRP) based at Chislehurst Caves, in the UK
 LAIRE - Fantasy LARP based in Sparta, New Jersey, United States
 LARP Alliance, Inc. - Promotes LARP and runs events, based in the United States, and Canada
 Lorien Trust - Fantasy physical combat system (UK)

M

 MagiQuest - Family fantasy in USA, uses IR wands
 MeAd - Medieval Fantasy in Gauteng, South Africa

N

 NERO International - Fantasy boffer combat group the United States and Canada. 
 New Zealand Live Action Role Playing Society - An umbrella organisation created to promote and support LARP throughout New Zealand.

P

Profound Decisions - professional LARP company running large fest games in the UK.  Currently runs Empire, previously ran Maelstrom and Odyssey.

R

Realm of Requiem - Persistent Fantasy Boffer LARP operating in Charlton, Massachusetts, United States

S

 Seventh Kingdom IGE - "Interactive Game Environment" based in New Jersey

 Shards of Orn - Fantasy boffer LARP based in Raleigh, NC
 Spearhead - Fantasy group in Guildford, UK

T

 Treasure Trap - Multiple independent fantasy latex weapon combat groups (UK)

U

 Underworld LARP - 18+ Horror/Fantasy boffer LARP based in Toronto, ON

References

Gaming-related lists
Live-action role-playing games